Hillberg is a surname. Notable people with the surname include:

 Linnéa Hillberg (1892–1977), Swedish actress
 Robert Hillberg (1917-2012), American firearms designer

Aviation
Hillberg Helicopters, an American aircraft manufacturer based in Fountain Valley, California

Weapons
 Hillberg Carbine, a light rifle concept for the US armed forces during WW2